Pestov is a Russian masculine surname, its feminine counterpart is Pestova. It may refer to
Daniela Peštová (born 1970), Czech model
Eva Peštová (born 1952), Czech ice dancer 
Marina Pestova (born 1964), Russian pair skater

Russian-language surnames